Bankhaus Lampe is an independent, private bank in Germany, founded in 1852 and headquartered in Bielefeld. The head office is in Dusseldorf, and additional offices are located in Germany, London, New York and Vienna. It is wholly owned by Hauck & Aufhäuser and focused on wealth management. The bank owns 50% of Universal Investment.

The Bank also offers planning, asset advice and management, finance, private equity, investments, foreign currency, and online banking services.

References

External links

 Bankhaus Lampe

Banks of Germany
Investment banks
Banks established in 1852
German companies established in 1852
Dr. Oetker